Arzuiyeh District is a former district (bakhsh) in Baft County, Kerman Province, Iran. At the 2006 census, its population was 36,859, in 8,204 families.  The District had one city: Arzuiyeh. The District had three rural districts (dehestan): Arzuiyeh Rural District, Soghan Rural District and Vakilabad Rural District. The district was dissolved in 2011 with the creation of Arzuiyeh County.

References 

Arzuiyeh County
Baft County
Former districts of Iran
Former districts of Kerman Province